Martin Rodriguez may refer to:

Martín Rodríguez (politician), Argentine politician
Martín Rodríguez (tennis), Argentine tennis player
Martin Rodrigues, drummer of the 1970s band Captain Beyond
Martín Rodríguez (field hockey) (born 1990), Chilean field hockey player
Martín Rodríguez (footballer, born 1968), Peruvian footballer
Martín Rodríguez (footballer, born 1970), Uruguayan footballer
Martín Rodríguez (footballer, born 1985), Uruguayan footballer
Martín Rodríguez (footballer, born 1989), Uruguayan footballer
Martín Rodríguez (footballer born 1994), Chilean footballer
Martín Rodríguez (rugby union) (born 1985), Argentine rugby union player
Martín Rodríguez (sailor) (born 1974), Argentine Olympic sailor
Martín Emilio Rodríguez (born 1942), Colombian cyclist